KMTV Asia is a South Korean television channel that launched in 2008, which broadcasts Korean music videos, music, variety, dramas and movies. It airs 24-hour programming continuously.

The channel airs an array of Korean entertainment programming, focusing on a mix of K-Pop music, variety show, idol drama and latest music videos and live performance of the hottest Korean stars and groups. The channel features dramas such as "Vampire Idol", "The Great Catsby", music series like "Show Champion", "Picnic Live", "THE SHOW All New K-POP", special reality series featuring Wonder Girls, Super Junior, Girls’ Generation, SHINee, 2PM, 2NE1, Big Bang, etc.

The channel currently airs on cable, IPTV and satellite networks in Hong Kong, Singapore, Taiwan, Thailand.

Highlight Programmes

 A Pink News Season 1, 2, 3
 HaHa & Friends
 Hidden Singer (JTBC)
 Show Champion (MBC Music)
 The Beauty's Taming the Idol Stars / Raising Idols 
 The SHOW  : All New K-POP (SBS MTV)
 The Strongest Couple / The Best Couple
 Vampire Idol (MBN)

In-house Programmes
 Idol Battle
 KMTV Collection
 KMTV K-POP Style
 KMTV Music Highway
 KMTV Music Star News
 KMTV Olleh Music Chart Top 100
 Sing Along K-POP
 U&Music
 Weekly Ballad Chart
 Weekly Dance Chart
 Weekly Hip-Hop Chart
 Weekly Super K-POP

References

Music television channels
Television networks in South Korea
Music organizations based in South Korea